William Roberts (born July 22, 1954) is a former provincial level politician from Alberta, Canada. He served as a member of the Legislative Assembly of Alberta from 1986 to 1993.

Political career
Roberts ran for office as a New Democrat candidate in the 1986 Alberta general election. He defeated incumbent Progressive Conservative MLA Mary LeMessurier by a margin of 100 votes. Roberts ran for a second term in office in the 1989 Alberta general election. In his second election he improved his margin of victory and won a comfortable plurality on a three-way split defeating five other candidates. Roberts retired at dissolution of the Legislature in 1993.

References

External links
Legislative Assembly of Alberta Members Listing

1954 births
Alberta New Democratic Party MLAs
Canadian Anglican priests
Living people
Politicians from Edmonton
Politicians from Hamilton, Ontario